James Moody (March 26, 1925 – December 9, 2010) was an American jazz saxophone and flute player and very occasional vocalist, playing predominantly in the bebop and hard bop styles.

Moody had an unexpected hit with "Moody's Mood for Love," a 1952 song written by Eddie Jefferson that used as its melody an improvised solo that Moody had played on a 1949 recording of "I'm in the Mood for Love." Moody adopted the song as his own, recording it with Jefferson on his 1956 album Moody's Mood for Love and performing the song regularly in concert, often singing the vocals himself.

Early life
James Moody was born in Savannah, Georgia, United States, and was raised by his (single) mother, Ruby Hann Moody Watters. He had a brother, Louis. Growing up in Newark, New Jersey, he was attracted to the saxophone after hearing "Buddy" George Holmes Tate, Don Byas, and various saxophonists who played with Count Basie. He later also took up the flute.

Career
Moody joined the US Army Air Corps in 1943 and played in the "negro band" at the segregated Greensboro Training Center.<ref>James Moody Biography, '[musicianguide.com. Retrieved April 17, 2022.</ref> Following his discharge from the military in 1946, he played bebop with Dizzy Gillespie for two years. Moody later played with Gillespie in 1964, where his colleagues in the Gillespie group, pianist Kenny Barron and guitarist Les Spann, would be musical collaborators in the coming decades.

In 1948, he recorded for Blue Note, his first session in a long recording career playing both saxophone and flute. That same year he relocated to Europe, where he stayed for three years, saying he had been "scarred by racism" in the U.S. His European work, including the first recording of "Moody's Mood for Love", which became a hit in 1952, saw him add the alto saxophone to his repertoire and helped to establish him as recording artist in his own right, and formed part of the growth of European jazz. Then in 1952, he returned to the U.S. to a recording career with Prestige Records and others, playing flute and saxophone in bands that included musicians such as Pee Wee Moore and others.

Moody and his Orchestra performed for the eleventh famed Cavalcade of Jazz concert held at Wrigley Field in Los Angeles which was produced by Leon Hefflin, Sr. on July 24, 1955. Also featured Big Jay McNeely, Lionel Hampton and his Orchestra, The Medallions and The Penguins.

In the 1960s, he rejoined Dizzy Gillespie. He later worked also with Mike Longo.

In 1997, Moody appeared as William Glover, the law firm's porter, in Clint Eastwood's movie adaptation of John Berendt's novel Midnight in the Garden of Good and Evil.

In a 1998 interview with Bob Bernotas, Moody stated that he believed jazz has definite spiritual resonance.

The James Moody Quartet (with pianist Renee Rosnes, bassist Todd Coolman, and drummer Adam Nussbaum) was Moody's vehicle later in his career. Moody played regularly with Dizzy Gillespie Alumni All-Stars and the Dizzy Gillespie All-Star Big Band and also often collaborated with former Gillespie alumnus, the trumpeter-composer-conductor Jon Faddis; Faddis and Moody worked in 2007 with the WDR Big Band in Cologne, Germany under the direction of Michael Abene. And along with Faddis, toured in 1986 with the Philip Morris Superband hosting artists like Hammond organist Jimmy Smith, Kenny Burrell, Grady Tate and Barbara Morrison. Included in this line-up were Niels-Henning Ørsted Pedersen, Jimmy Heath, Kenny Washington, Slide Hampton and Monty Alexander on a four-country, 14-city one-month tour of 18 concerts, notably in Australia, Canada, Japan and the Philippines, starting on September 3, 1986, with its first concert in Perth, Australia. The Philip Morris Superband concept started a year previous in 1985.

Awards and honors
Two months after his death, Moody won the Grammy Award posthumously for Best Jazz Instrumental Album for his album Moody 4B.

The New Jersey Performing Arts Center hosts the James Moody Democracy of Jazz Festival.Tammy La Gorce, "A Week of Jazz and Remembrance", The New York Times, October 5, 2012.

Personal life
Moody was married three times; the first two ended in divorce. His third marriage was to the former Linda Petersen McGowan, whom he married in 1989. He had a daughter, Michelle Moody Bagdanove, and through Linda, three step-sons, Regan, Danny and Patrick McGowan. Moody and his wife resided in San Diego.

He was an active member of the Baháʼí Faith. In 2005, the Moodys established the Moody Scholarship Fund at the Conservatory of Music at Purchase College-State University of New York (SUNY Purchase). Moody was awarded an NEA Jazz Masters Fellowship in 1998 and often participated in educational programming and outreach, including with the International Association for Jazz Education, or IAJE.

Moody was fluent in Italian.

Death
On November 2, 2010, Moody's wife announced on his behalf that he had pancreatic cancer, and had chosen not to have it treated aggressively. After palliative care, Moody died in San Diego, on December 9, 2010, from complications resulting from the cancer.

Discography
As leader
 1949: James Moody's Greatest Hits! with The Swedish All Stars (Prestige [1966])
 1951: More of James Moody's Greatest Hits with The Swedish All Stars (Prestige [1967])
 1952: James Moody and his Modernists (Blue Note)
 1952: James Moody with Strings (Blue Note) – Conducted by André Hodeir (originally Moody's Mood, Vogue (France))
 1954: Moody (Prestige)
 1954–55: James Moody's Moods (Prestige)
 1955: Hi Fi Party (Prestige)
 1955: Wail, Moody, Wail (Prestige)
 1956: Flute 'n the Blues (Argo)
 1956: Moody's Mood for Love (Argo)
 1958: Last Train from Overbrook (Argo)
 1959: James Moody (Argo)
 1960: Hey! It's James Moody (Argo)
 1960–61: Moody with Strings (Argo)
 1961: Cookin' the Blues (Argo)
 1962: Another Bag (Argo)
 1963: Great Day (Argo)
 1963: Comin' On Strong (Argo)
 1964: Running the Gamut (Scepter)
 1966: Moody and the Brass Figures (Milestone)
 1968–69: The Blues and Other Colors (Milestone)
 1969: Don't Look Away Now! (Prestige)
 1970: Teachers (Perception)
 1971: Heritage Hum (Perception)
 1971: Chicago Concert (Prestige) with Gene Ammons
 1972: Never Again! (Muse)
 1973: Feelin' It Together (Muse)
 1973: Sax and Flute Man (Paula)
 1976: Timeless Aura (Vanguard)
 1976: Sun Journey (Vanguard)
 1977: Beyond this World (Vanguard)
 1986: Something Special (Novus)
 1989: Sweet and Lovely (Novus)
 1991: Moving Forward (Novus)
 1991: Honey  (Novus)
 1995: Moody's Party: Live at the Blue Note (Telarc)
 1996: Young at Heart (Warner Bros.)
 1997: Moody Plays Mancini (Warner Bros.)
 1997: Warner Jams, Vol. 2: The Two Tenors with Mark Turner, Larry Goldings (Warner Bros.)
 1998: At the Jazz Workshop GRP AllMusic
 2003: Homage (Savoy)
 2005: The World Is a Ghetto (Fuel 2000)
 2008:	Our Delight with Hank Jones (IPO)
 2009: Moody 4A (IPO)
 2010: Moody 4B (IPO)

As sideman
With Art FarmerNew York Jazz Sextet: Group Therapy (Scepter, 1966)
With Gil FullerNight Flight (Pacific Jazz, 1965) - all titles released on CD reissue of Gil Fuller & the Monterey Jazz Festival Orchestra featuring Dizzy GillespieWith Dizzy GillespieThe Complete RCA Victor Recordings (Bluebird, 1937-1949 [1995])Big Band in Concert (GNP Crescendo, 1948)The New Continent (Limelight, 1962)Something Old, Something New (Philips, 1963)Dizzy Gillespie and the Double Six of Paris (Philips, 1964)Dizzy Goes Hollywood (Philips, 1964)The Cool World (Philips, 1964)Jambo Caribe (Limelight, 1964)I/We Had a Ball (Limelight, 1965) - 1 trackThe Melody Lingers On (Limelight, 1966)Swing Low, Sweet Cadillac (Impulse!, 1967)The Dizzy Gillespie Reunion Big Band (MPS, 1968)The Real Thing (Perception, 1969) Musician, Composer, Raconteur (Pablo, 1981)Live at the Royal Festival Hall (Enja, 1989)
With The Dizzy Gillespie Alumni All-StarsDizzy's World directed by Jon Faddis (Shanachie, 1999)Things to Come (Telarc, 2001)
With The Dizzy Gillespie All-Star Big BandDizzy's Business (MCG Jazz, 2006)I'm Be Boppin' Too (Half Note, 2009)
With Dexter GordonThe Tower of Power! (Prestige, 1969)More Power! (Prestige, 1969)
With Milt JacksonBig Bags (Riverside, 1962)Milt Jackson at the Museum of Modern Art (Limelight, 1965)Milt Jackson and the Hip String Quartet (Verve, 1968)
With Elvin JonesSummit Meeting (Vanguard, 1976) with Clark Terry, Bunky Green and Roland Prince 
With Quincy JonesI/We Had a Ball (Limelight, 1965)Quincy Plays for Pussycats (Mercury, 1959-65 [1965])
With Charles MingusCharles Mingus and Friends in Concert (Columbia, 1972)
With Max Roach
New Sounds: Max Roach Quintet/Art Blakey's Band (Blue Note, 1952)With Lalo SchifrinOnce a Thief and Other Themes (Verve, 1965)With Bobby TimmonsGot to Get It! (Milestone, 1967)With Cedar WaltonSoul Cycle (Prestige, 1969)With Tubby HayesReturn Visit! (Fontana, 1962) Credited as "Jimmy Gloomy"With Roberta Gambarini'''Easy To Love (Groovin' High/Kindred Rhythm, 2006) Moody plays tenor sax and sings with Roberta on "Lover Man" and "Centerpiece".So In Love'' (Groovin' High/EmArcy/UMe, 2009)

References

External links
Biography of Moody jamesmoody.com, official website
Biography of Moody University of Pittsburgh-Jazz at Pitt
Jazz Conversations with Eric Jackson: James Moody  from WGBH Radio Boston
James Moody's oral history video excerpts at The National Visionary Leadership Project
NAMM Oral History Interview with James Moody April 8, 2002

1925 births
2010 deaths
Musicians from Savannah, Georgia
Musicians from San Diego
Hard bop musicians
African-American jazz musicians
American jazz saxophonists
American male saxophonists
American jazz flautists
20th-century American male actors
American Bahá'ís
African-American Bahá'ís
Musicians from Las Vegas
Musicians from Newark, New Jersey
Blue Note Records artists
Prestige Records artists
Mercury Records artists
Muse Records artists
Warner Records artists
Deaths from pancreatic cancer
Deaths from cancer in California
United States Air Force airmen
20th-century Bahá'ís
21st-century Bahá'ís
Jazz musicians from California
American male jazz musicians
20th-century African-American people
21st-century African-American people
EmArcy Records artists
20th-century American saxophonists
20th-century flautists
Argo Records artists